Maximiliano David González (born 12 March 1994) is an Argentine professional footballer who plays as a midfielder for Atlanta.

Career
González, signing from Club Remedios, first appeared in the Rosario Central first-team in July 2014, when he was an unused sub in the Copa Argentina versus Juventud Unida Universitario. González made his professional debut on 13 February 2015 during a victory at the Estadio Presidente Juan Domingo Perón against Racing Club, he was subbed on with ten minutes remaining for Jonás Aguirre. It was one of eight appearances for González in 2015. June 2016 saw González join Quilmes on loan. He went on to feature twenty times, he also scored in his penultimate appearance on 21 June 2017 versus Arsenal de Sarandí.

After returning to Rosario Central for the 2017–18 season, González netted his first goal for the club in February 2018 during a 5–0 home win over Olimpo. On 1 August 2018, González joined Tigre on loan. He made just three appearances for the club, partly due to a torn cruciate injury. González left Rosario permanently in 2019 to sign for Alvarado of Primera B Nacional. His debut came in a draw away to Barracas Central on 24 August, with his one and only goal for them arriving in November against Belgrano. August 2020 saw San Martín sign González.

Ahead of the 2022 season, González joined Atlanta.

Career statistics
.

References

External links

1994 births
Living people
People from San Lorenzo Department
Argentine footballers
Association football midfielders
Argentine Primera División players
Primera Nacional players
Rosario Central footballers
Quilmes Atlético Club footballers
Club Atlético Tigre footballers
Club Atlético Alvarado players
San Martín de San Juan footballers
Club Atlético Atlanta footballers
Sportspeople from Santa Fe Province